Teer  is a village of Haripur District.

Population 
According to the census 1998, Government of Pakistan, Statistic Division, Population Census Organization, the population of the village is about 2980 which include 1448 is male and 1532 are females and the literacy rate is about 46.8%.

Language 
Hindko is the native language of all the residents of the town.

References 

Union councils of Haripur District